The Idice is a river in the Tuscany and Emilia-Romagna regions of Italy. The source of the river is in the province of Florence near Monghidoro in the Appennino Tosco-Emiliano mountains. The river flows north into the province of Bologna near Monterenzio before being joined by the Savena east of Bologna. The river then curves eastward and flows near Castenaso and Budrio before flowing into the province of Ferrara. It then flows into the Reno near where the Sillaro enters the Reno southeast of Argenta.

References

Rivers of the Province of Florence
Rivers of the Province of Bologna
Rivers of the Province of Ferrara
Rivers of the Apennines
Rivers of Italy